MXGP The Official Motocross Videogame was the first in a series of racing video games developed and published by Milestone. The game was released worldwide on 18 November 2014 for Microsoft Windows, PlayStation 3, PlayStation 4, PlayStation Vita and Xbox 360.

The game is based on the 2014 FIM Motocross World Championship and includes 18 tracks (including Arco, Trentino, Sevlievo and Loket) and features deformable terrain.

The third installment in the series, now MXGP3 and dropping "The Official Videogame" from its title, was released on 12 May 2017 for Microsoft Windows, PlayStation 4, and Xbox One. It was released in November 2017 for Nintendo Switch. MacOS and Linux ports by Virtual Programming were released in November 2018.

The series was retitled MXGP Pro for its 29 June 2018. This title is available for Microsoft Windows, PlayStation 4, and Xbox One. The series was once again retitled for its 27 August 2019 iteration, released as MXGP 2019. This release was available for Microsoft Windows, PlayStation 4, and Xbox One.

Games

References 

2014 video games
Embracer Group franchises
Video games developed in Italy
Motocross World Championship video games
Racing video games
PlayStation 3 games
PlayStation 4 games
PlayStation Vita games
Windows games
Xbox 360 games
Multiplayer and single-player video games
Milestone srl games
Video games set in Qatar
Video games set in Thailand
Video games set in Brazil
Video games set in Italy
Video games set in Bulgaria
Video games set in Spain
Video games set in the United Kingdom
Video games set in France
Video games set in Germany
Video games set in Sweden
Video games set in Finland
Video games set in the Czech Republic
Video games set in Belgium
Video games set in Mexico